Pherecydes is a genus of African crab spiders first described by Octavius Pickard-Cambridge in 1883.

Species
 it contains eight species:
Pherecydes carinae Dippenaar-Schoeman, 1980 — South Africa
Pherecydes ionae Dippenaar-Schoeman, 1980 — Tanzania
Pherecydes livens Simon, 1895 — Tunisia
Pherecydes lucinae Dippenaar-Schoeman, 1980 — South Africa
Pherecydes nicolaasi Dippenaar-Schoeman, 1980 — South Africa
Pherecydes tuberculatus O. Pickard-Cambridge, 1883 — South Africa, Lesotho
Pherecydes zebra Lawrence, 1927 — West, Southern Africa
Pherecydes z. tropicalis Millot, 1942 — Burkina Faso

References

External links

 

Araneomorphae genera
Thomisidae